The 1949 NCAA Wrestling Championships were the 19th NCAA Wrestling Championships to be held. Colorado A&M in Fort Collins, Colorado hosted the tournament at their South College Gymnasium.

Oklahoma A&M took home the team championship with 32 points and having two individual champions.

Charles Hetrick of Oklahoma A&M was named the Outstanding Wrestler.

Team results

Individual finals

References

NCAA Division I Wrestling Championship
Wrestling competitions in the United States
1949 in American sports
1949 in sports in Colorado